is a Philippine-born Japanese professional basketball player for the Nagasaki Velca in Japan. He moved to Yonago, Tottori, Japan at the age of seven. He was selected by the Shimane Susanoo Magic with the 14th overall pick in the 2010 bj League draft. He also plays for the 3storm Hiroshima.Exe.

Early life and education
Born in  Caloocan, Philippines, Edward Yamamoto was born to Filipino parents. Edward's father died when he was at a young age. His mother would then marry a Japanese national and his family would emigrate to Japan when Edward was seven years old. Spending a part of his childhood in the Philippines, he continued playing basketball when he moved to Japan. Yamamoto would reside at Yonago while attending Hokuriku High School in Fukui and at Daito Bunka University in Tokyo.

Career
Yamamoto would be considered as a local or domestic player in the B.League due to his history of attending Japanese schools. He turned professional when he joined the Shimane Susanoo Magic when it was part of the Bj league in 2010. He remained with the team when it joined the B.League in 2016. He moved to the Toyotsu Fighting Eagles Nagoya of the B2 League in 2018 before moving back to the first division when he signed up to play for the Shinshu Brave Warriors in 2020. After playing a season for Shinshu, Yamamoto moved to third division team, Nagasaki Velca.

Career statistics 

|-
| 2010–11
| Shimane
| 47 || 9 || 14.6 || .301 || .260 || .920 || 1.7 || 1.7 || 0.7 || 0.0 || 3.3
|-
| 2011–12
| Shimane
| 52 || 50 || 32.9 || .377 || .304 || .690 || 3.6 || 4.8 || 1.2 || 0.1 || 6.1
|-
| 2012–13
| Shimane
| 51 || 22 || 25.1 || .438 || .392 || .686 || 2.6 || 3.5 || 0.7 || 0.0 || 6.3
|-
| 2013–14
| Shimane
| 52 || 33 || 27.8 || .424 || .381 || .739 || 2.1 || 4.4 || 0.9 || 0.0 || 7.9
|-
|  2014–15
| Shimane
| 52 || 48 || 31.3 || .444 || .440 || .857 || 2.7 || 3.4 || 0.8 || 0.0 || 12.2
|-
|  2015–16
| Shimane
| 50||45 || 27.5 || .366 || .343 || .886 || 2.9 || 2.5 || 1.5 || 0.0 || 9.1
|-
|  2016–17
| Shimane
| 60 || 60 || 26.5 || .444 || bgcolor="CFECEC"|.453*|| .869 || 2.8 || 2.7 || 1.0 || 0.0 || 9.4
|-
| style="background-color:#FFCCCC" | 2017–18
| Shimane
| 48 || 18 || 18.8 || .386 || .317 || .750 || 1.2 || 2.1 || 0.8 || 0.0 || 4.5
|-

References

Japanese people of Filipino descent
Japanese men's basketball players
People from Caloocan
Shimane Susanoo Magic players
Sportspeople from Tottori Prefecture
Toyotsu Fighting Eagles Nagoya players
Nagasaki Velca players
1986 births
Living people
Shooting guards
Basketball players from Metro Manila
Filipino men's basketball players
People from Yonago, Tottori
Filipino emigrants to Japan